Shotter is a surname. Notable people with the surname include:

Constance Shotter (1911–1989), British actress
Edward Shotter (1933–2019), British Anglican priest and author
David Shotter (1939 – 2021)  British Archaeologist
Ralph Shotter (1907–1994), British actor
Spencer Proudfoot Shotter (1855–1920), Canadian businessman
Winifred Shotter (1904–1996), British actress

See also
 Thomas Shotter Boys (1803–1874) English painter and lithographer. 
 MTA1 World#Shotter Shondane Bengali language Islamic website